The 2009 CIS Men's University Cup Hockey Tournament (47th Annual) was held March 26–29, 2009. It was the first year of a two-year CIS Championship bid by Lakehead University and was hosted at Fort William Gardens hockey rink.

Similar to previous years, going back to the introduction of the expanded format in 1998, the six invited teams were split into two pools of three in which each team played the other (two games total). The best team in each pool advanced to the final. All pool games had to be decided by a win; there were no ties. If a pool had a three-way tie for 1st (all teams had 1–1 records) than goals for/goals against differential among the tied teams was the first tie-breaker.

The UNB Varsity Reds advanced to the finals for the third straight year and won their second title in two years, having won in 2007 in Moncton.

Road to the Cup

AUS playoffs

OUA Playoffs
The 2009 OUA hockey Conference had two divisions broken-up further into two groups each for a total of four groups: Far-East, Mid-East, Mid-West and Far-West. The pennant winner of each group advanced to the second round and the next best four teams in the division (across both groups) played each other in the first round. The 'next best four' approach accounted for weaknesses and strengths between teams in the same division (as an example,: in the East, the 'next best four' teams all came from the Far-East Group; McGill, Concordia, Carleton and Ottawa).   

Since Lakehead was hosting the University Cup and did not advance to the Queen's Cup final and an OUA team can not be a wild-card when the University Cup is hosted by an OUA team, there was no requirement for a bronze medal game.

Canada West playoffs

University Cup 
The six teams that advanced to the tournament are listed below. The wild-card team was selected from the AUS Conference as the CW was provided the wild-card in 2008 and OUA teams were ineligible as they were the host conference. With Lakehead losing in the first round of the playoffs, they were a natural 'host' and are the 6th seed.

Ranking was based on the last Top 10 media release for the season, February 17, well before the end of the playoffs. The Ranking Committee provided the Tournament Committee with a 6-team mini-ranking prior to the tournament which was then used for seeding. As this was not a 'formal' Top 10, it was not released to the media leaving the February 17 ranking as the last and most recent Top 10.

Pool A - Evening

Pool B - Afternoon

Note: The Western Mustangs were the second team in the expanded 6-team format, to advance to the championship final with a 1–1 record. The Alberta Golden Bears were the first team to advanced to the finals with a 1–1 record, which occurred the previous season in Moncton.

Championship final
Bench assignments were based on each advancing team's 2 pool games, not their tournament seed. UNB was assigned the home bench based on their record of 2-0 versus Western at 1-1.

Tournament All-Stars
Lachlan MacIntosh, a forward from the UNB Varsity Reds, was selected as the Major W.J. 'Danny' McLeod Award for CIS University Cup MVP. He had a hat-trick in the Gold Medal final to finish with five goals and one assist for six points, tying for the tournament lead with teammate Kyle Baily's one goal and five assists, and was UNB's Game MVP in the finals as well as in their tournament opener versus Alberta on Thursday.

Joining MacIntosh on the tournament all-star team were:

Goaltender: Travis Fullerton, UNB Varsity Reds
Defenseman: Dustin Friesen, UNB Varsity Reds
Defenseman: Chris Petrow, Western Mustangs
Forward: Kyle Bailey, UNB Varsity Reds
Forward: Joe McCann, Western Mustangs

References

U Sports ice hockey
University Cup, 2010